The Cherokee Strip is a 1937 American Western film directed by Noel M. Smith and written by Luci Ward and Joseph K. Watson. The film stars Dick Foran, Jane Bryan, Robert Paige, Joan Valerie, Edmund Cobb and Joseph Crehan. The film was released by Warner Bros. on May 15, 1937.

Plot

Cast  
Dick Foran as Dick Hudson
Jane Bryan as Janie Walton
Robert Paige as Tom Valley 
Joan Valerie as Ruth Valley 
Edmund Cobb as Link Carter 
Joseph Crehan as Army Officer
Milton Kibbee as Blade Simpson
Gordon Hart as Judge Ben Parkinson
Frank Faylen as Joe Brady
Jack Mower as Bill Tidewell
Tom Brower as George Walton
Walter Soderling as Mink Abbott
Tommy Bupp as Barty Walton

References

External links 
 

1937 films
American Western (genre) films
1937 Western (genre) films
Warner Bros. films
Films directed by Noel M. Smith
American black-and-white films
1930s English-language films
1930s American films